Midrash Eleh Ezkerah ( ʾĒlle ʾEzkərā) is an aggadic midrash, one of the smaller midrashim, which receives its name from the fact that a seliḥah for the Day of Atonement, which treats the same subject and begins with the words "Eleh ezkerah," recounts the execution of ten famous teachers of the Mishnah in the time of the persecution by Hadrian (see Ten Martyrs). The same event is related in a very ancient source, Eichah Rabbah.

The version in Eleh Ezkerah 
According to the Midrash Eleh Ezkerah, and a brief parallel source in Midrash Mishlei,   a Roman emperor commanded the execution of the ten sages of Israel to expiate the guilt of the sons of Jacob, who had sold their brother Joseph—a crime which, according to Exodus 21:16, had to be punished with death.

The names of the martyrs are given here, as in the seliḥah already mentioned (varying in part from Eichah Rabbah and Midrash Tehillim), as follows:
 R. Simeon ben Gamliel
 R. Ishmael ben Elisha ha-Kohen  
 R. Akiva 
 R. Haninah ben Teradion 
 R. Judah ben Bava
 R. Judah ben Dama
 R. Hutzpit the Interpreter
 R. Hanina ben Hakinai
 R. Jeshbab the Scribe
 R. Eleazar ben Shammua

Although this midrash employs other sources, borrowing its introduction from the Midrash Konen, and the account of the conversation of Rabbi Ishmael with the angels in heaven probably from the Hekalot, it forms, nevertheless, a coherent work. It was edited, on the basis of a Hamburg codex, by A. Jellinek and, according to another manuscript, by S. Chones, in his Rav Pe'alim. A second and a third recension of the midrash were edited, on the basis of manuscript sources, in Jellinek's B. H., and a fourth is contained in the Spanish liturgical work Bet Av. According to Jellinek, "the fourth recension is the oldest, since it has borrowed large portions from the Hekalot; next to this stand the second and the third; while the youngest is the first, which, nevertheless, has the advantage of real conformity with the spirit of the race and represents this the best of all." The martyrdom of the ten sages is also treated in the additions to the Hekalot and in the ḳinah for the Ninth of Ab.

References

 Its bibliography:
Zunz, G. V. p. 142;
A. Jellinek, B. H. 2:23 et seq.; 5:41; 6:17 et seq.;
Benjacob, Oẓar ha-Sefarim, p. 299.
On the problem of the synchronism of the ten martyrs see Heinrich Grätz, Gesch. iv. 175 et seq., and Monatsschrift, i. 314 et seq.
A German translation by P. Möbius appeared in 1845.

External links 
Free download of English translation of Eleh Ezkerah by Rabbi David Sedley
English translation of Eleh Ezerah by Rabbi David Sedley

Smaller midrashim